Mohakhali Bus Terminal is one of three main inter-city bus stations in Dhaka (local name tangail bus stand),  opened in 1984. Located in the Mohakhali neighbourhood, it primarily serves destinations in northern Bangladesh, including Tangail, Netrokona, Mymensingh, Jamalpur, Sherpur, Kishoreganj, and Bogra.

Renovations to the terminal were completed in 2005. The 15 crore taka ($2.3M) rehabilitation was part of the Dhaka Urban Transport Project, funded by a World Bank loan.

The  site can accommodate 300 buses. As of 2015, companies operate 800 daily trips from the terminal, on 60 different routes.

References

Bus stations in Bangladesh
Transport in Dhaka